Taygete Cone is an extinct volcanic cone northeast of Alcyone Cone in the north part of The Pleiades, Victoria Land. Named by the New Zealand Antarctic Place-Names Committee (NZ-APC) after Taygete (Taygeta), one of the stars in the Pleiades.

References 

Volcanoes of Victoria Land
Pennell Coast